Lancai Township (Mandarin: 兰采乡) is a township in Tongren County, Huangnan Tibetan Autonomous Prefecture, Qinghai, China. In 2010, Lancai Township had a total population of 4,207: 2,133 males and 2,074 females: 1,312 aged under 14, 2,664 aged between 15 and 65 and 231 aged over 65.

References 

Huangnan Tibetan Autonomous Prefecture
Township-level divisions of Qinghai